Steve Gomer is an American film and television director.

He made his directorial debut with Sweet Lorriane (1987), starring Maureen Stapleton, and went on to direct  (1993), Sunset Park (1996) (starring Rhea Perlman) and Barney's Great Adventure (1998), based on the Barney & Friends television series from (1992-2009). Gomer shifted into television directing in 2000 with the "Hanlon's Choice" episode of Chicago Hope. He has since directed for Gilmore Girls, Ally McBeal, Joan of Arcadia, The Unit, Private Practice and several other programs.

After a hiatus of six years, Gomer returned to directing with All Saints (2017), based on the true story of preacher Michael Spurlock and the All Saints Church. All Saints proved to be his most critically and commercially successful film, earning a 95% approval rating on Rotten Tomatoes and a worldwide box office gross of $5.9 million on a budget of $2 million.

References

External links

American film directors
American television directors
American television producers
Living people
Place of birth missing (living people)
Year of birth missing (living people)